Tony Fiore (born August 7, 1962) is a Canadian-Italian retired professional ice hockey center.

Career
After scoring 82 goals and 110 assists in 147 games with the QMJHL's Montreal Juniors between 1980 and 1982, Fiore was selected 165nd overall by the Boston Bruins at the 1982 NHL Entry Draft. He never played in NHL.

He spent the next two seasons split between the AHL and IHL with Hershey Bears and Flint Generals.

Later he played most in Italian Serie A with HC Auronzo (1984-1986), Alleghe Hockey (1986-1987), HC Milano Saima (1987-1992), SG Milano Saima (1993-1995) and HC Milano 24 (1995-1996). He won a scudetto with HC Milano Saima in year 1991.

He was a member of the Italian national team at the Group B World Championships in 1989 and 1991.

After his retirement during the summer 1996, he was hired as General Manager of HC Milano 24, but president Quintavalle fired Fiore due to lack of result in January 1997.

Later he became a sports agent.

Career statistics

Awards and achievements
Serie A:
HC Milano Saima: 1990-1991
Gary F. Longman Memorial Trophy: 1982-1983

References

External links

1962 births
Living people
Canadian people of Italian descent
HC Alleghe players
HC Milano Saima players
Montreal Juniors players
Canadian ice hockey centres
Italian ice hockey players
Tulsa Oilers (1992–present) players
Baltimore Skipjacks players
Hershey Bears players
Flint Generals (IHL) players
Ice hockey people from Montreal
Boston Bruins draft picks
Serie A (ice hockey) players
Canadian expatriate ice hockey players in Italy
Canadian expatriate ice hockey players in the United States